Frederick Potts may refer to:

Frederic A. Potts (1836–1888), American coal merchant and politician
Fred Potts (1892–1943), English recipient of the Victoria Cross
Fred Potts (footballer) (1893–?), English footballer